The Netherlands national cricket team toured Barbados in June 2001 and played two matches against the Barbadian team. The touring Dutch team was captained by Roland Lefebvre.

Matches

References

2001 in Dutch cricket
2001 in West Indian cricket
Barbados